Originally produced by Minolta, and currently produced by Sony, the AF Apo Tele 300mm 2.8 G (D) SSM is a professional telephoto prime photographic lens compatible with cameras using the Minolta A-mount and Sony A-mount lens mounts.

See also
 List of Minolta A-mount lenses

Sources
Dyxum lens data

External links
Sony: SAL-300F28G: 300mm F2.8 G

300